Sani Mohammed Sha'aban (born 4 August 1958) in Zaria, Kaduna State, Nigeria is a politician and businessman. He served as a member of the Nigerian House of Representatives from May 2003 to May 2007 representing Zaria.

References

External links
 About Sani Sha'aban

Living people
1958 births
People from Zaria
21st-century Nigerian politicians